Dive! (stylized as DIVE!!) is a Japanese novel series written by Eto Mori and published in four volumes by Kodansha between August 2000 and August 2002. A manga adaptation, in collaboration with Masahiro Ikeno, was serialized in Shogakukan's Weekly Shōnen Sunday between June 2007 and June 2008. A live-action film premiered in June 2008. Another manga adaptation, in collaboration with Ruzuru Akashiba, was serialized in Kadokawa Shoten's Young Ace between June 2017 and August 2018. An anime television series by Zero-G aired on Fuji TV's Noitamina programming block from July to September 2017.

Plot
The story centers on the Mizuki Diving Club (MDC) member Tomoki Sakai. The MDC has fallen on hard times, and their sponsors are preparing to pull their support. They promise to give the club another year of support if the new coach, Kayoko Asaki, can get one of the members into the Olympics in a year's time.

Characters

Main Characters

Portrayed by: Kento Hayashi
A middle schooler in the MDC who's been diving for six years. He has a natural flexibility and an excellent dynamic vision. He was a mediocre diver at first, but quickly improved under the guidance of Kayoko.

Portrayed by: Sosuke Ikematsu / Takumi Kitamura
A diving thoroughbred with two former divers as parents. He's a high school student who's been diving ever since his second-year in elementary school. He was the middle school champion for three years in a row. 

Portrayed by: Junpei Mizobata

MDC Members

MDC Coaches

Rivals

Tomoki's Acquaintances

Media

Novels
Dive!! is a series of novels written by Eto Mori. Four tankōbon were published by Kadokawa between April 20, 2000, and August 8, 2002. Kodansha released the series in two bunkobon on May 26, 2006. A combined version of the two bunkobon was also released on June 18, 2016, as an e-book.

Manga
A manga adaptation, in collaboration with Masahiro Ikeno, ran in Shogakukan's Weekly Shōnen Sunday between June 13, 2007, and June 4, 2008. Shogakukan collected its chapters in five tankōbon volumes, released from October 18, 2007, to July 18, 2008.

Another manga adaptation, illustrated by Ruzuru Akashiba, was serialized in Kadokawa Shoten's Young Ace between June 2, 2017, and September 4, 2018. Yen Press announced at Anime Expo 2018 that they had licensed the new manga adaptation.

Film
A film based on the novels was released in 2008. Directed by Naoto Kumazawa, starring Kento Hayashi.

Anime
An anime television series aired from July 6 to September 21, 2017, on Fuji TV's Noitamina block. Kaoru Suzuki directed it at Zero-G, Touko Machida in charge of scripts and Yuki Hayashi in charge of music composition. The opening theme is "Taiyō mo Hitoribocchi" (The Sun Is Also Lonely) performed by Kyoto-based band Qyoto. The ending theme is "New World" performed by solo artist Yūta Hashimoto. It was streamed by Amazon on its Anime Strike. Sentai Filmworks acquired the license for the North American rights and gave the series a Blu-ray release in December 2018.

Drama
In April 2021, a live action drama series began airing in Japan. Three main actors are part of the idol group Hihi Jets.

Reception
Anime News Network had five editors review the first episode of the anime: Theron Martin said that despite the animation not being eye-catching, he commended it for having likable characters with heart and setting up an intriguing story from the start; Paul Jensen was critical of both the male cast having dissimilar personalities and the art of diving only being half explained but said that a couple of episodes can help the series' narrative be more focused and capture the attention of genre viewers; James Beckett found the cast of male characters unappealing in terms of design and the diving scenes lacking in excitement but was optimistic of the Olympic plotline being able to put the series in the right direction; Rebecca Silverman felt that both plotlines involving the Mizuki Diving Club and Tomoki's arc weren't particularly interesting and the lack of characterization for Yoichi beyond his physique and being the sport's motivational spokesman. The fifth reviewer, Nick Creamer, criticized it for making the sport of diving sound boring, lacking any directional hook for both the story and its characters and being unimpressive in its animation, concluding that it "isn't necessarily the worst show I've watched this season, it probably does the most to squander its potential. Maybe check it out if you're really intrigued by the concept, but both the writing and visual problems here seem pretty insurmountable."

Silverman reviewed the first two volumes of the 2017 manga adaptation in 2019. Despite finding criticism in the characterization of Asaki and the story being too angst-ridden and poorly paced in places, she praised the focus on the characters' insecurities away from the sport (highlighting Tomoki's personal life) and the art for capturing the difficulties of diving, concluding that: "It certainly deserves to stand on its own merits rather than suffer from comparisons, and if you're looking for something a little less intense on the sports manga front than some of the other offerings out there, this is an interesting story."

Notes

References

External links
 Dive!! (Shogakukan manga) at Web Sunday 
  
 

2017 anime television series debuts
2007 manga
Anime Strike
Book series introduced in 2000
Comedy anime and manga
Japanese comedy films
Kadokawa Dwango franchises
Kadokawa Shoten manga
Noitamina
Sentai Filmworks
Shogakukan manga
Shōnen manga
Swimming in anime and manga
Yen Press titles
Zero-G (studio)